The 1886 Dublin University, by-election was a parliamentary by-election held for the United Kingdom House of Commons constituency of Dublin University on 13 August 1886. Following the general election of that year and the formation of a new government, both elected members in this two-seat constituency were appointed to government posts: David Plunket as First Commissioner of Public Works, and Hugh Holmes as Attorney-General for Ireland. According to the rules of the era, this required them to submit to re-election. No other candidate was nominated for either seat, and Plunket and Holmes were therefore elected unopposed: Plunket at 11 o'clock and Holmes at 12.

References

1886 elections in the United Kingdom
August 1886 events
By-elections to the Parliament of the United Kingdom in Dublin University
Unopposed ministerial by-elections to the Parliament of the United Kingdom in Irish constituencies
1886 elections in Ireland